The Baltimore Science Fiction Society (BSFS) is a literary organization focusing on science fiction, fantasy and related genres. A 501c3 literary society based in Baltimore, Maryland, the BSFS sponsors Balticon, the Maryland Regional Science Fiction Convention.

Activities
BSFS is an active organization which hosts many free, public events at its headquarters in the Highlandtown section of Baltimore City. Located at 3310 East Baltimore Street, it holds a business meeting on the second Saturday of each month at 7 PM that covers planning for Balticon and general BSFS organizational issues. It also hosts an anime, manga, and gaming social event on the third Saturday of the month from 2 – 6 PM. BSFS also hosts a Speculative Fiction Critique Circle for science fiction, fantasy, horror, etc. writers to receive feedback on their work: that Circle meets on the 2nd and 4th Thursday of every month, from 6:30 PM – 8:30 PM. There is also a Book Discussion Circle that meets on the 4th Saturday of every month, from 6:30 to 8 PM, to discuss and analyze an assigned book; then there is a General Social Meeting which follows right after that. And on the 2nd and 4th Sundays of each month, the Games Club of Maryland hosts a gaming day called Alphabet Soup at BSFS headquarters from 12 –6PM. Authors such as Catherine Asaro, Philippa Ballantine, Charles Shields, T.J. Perkins, and others have spoken there in recent years. It maintains a large free lending library, cooperates with other science fiction organizations, runs www.bsfs.org which is a detailed website with extensive resources, and conducts other public outreach events promoting literacy. BSFS is an open, equal organization which welcomes every gender, sex, religion, and creed.

BSFS sponsors a young writers contest for Maryland students named "The Jack L. Chalker Young Writers Contest." BSFS conducts the annual Bobby Gear Memorial Charity Auction to fund the BSFS Books for Kids program which gives free reading books to students in cooperation with a Maryland school/schools.

The BSFS has presented the Compton Crook Award each Balticon SM (since 1983) for "... the best first novel in the genre published during the previous year ...". The list of eligible books is published in the monthly newsletter so all club members will have a chance to read and vote. The winning author is invited to Balticon SM (BSFS pays transportation and lodging) and presented with the cash award. Compton Crook, who used the nom de plume Stephen Tall, died in 1981. He was a long time Baltimore resident, a Towson University professor, and, of course, a science fiction author.

History
The Baltimore Science Fiction Society was first formed on  January 5, 1963, on the back seat of a Trailways bus, by people returning from a meeting of the Washington Science Fiction Association (WSFA). Early founding members including a preponderance of influential writers, including noted fantasist Jack Chalker and Robert Howard scholar Mark Owings, attracting luminaries Roger Zelazny (who at the time was still working for nearby Social Security Administration), Joe and Jack Haldeman, and many others. There was a close alliance with neighboring WSFS, with strong cross-pollination, aiding the growth of both organizations, assisted by Jerry Jacks, Gay Haldeman, and Stephen Patt. It went into suspension as an organization after an election of officers which proved disastrous on October 12, 1968, on a (non-functioning) streetcar. Its only production of consequence was starting Balticon SM (1966) and it has in common with the present group only the name, spirit, Balticon, and continuity of the same three founding members.

There was no formal BSFS during the intervening years, but several fans managed to keep the Balticon SM tradition alive by holding Balticons SM number 3 through 8.

Present
The present Baltimore Science Fiction Society was restarted in 1974 when it was incorporated in the State of Maryland.  It applied for and was granted IRS tax exempt status.

BSFS is the third Science Fiction society in the country to own their own meeting place. LASFS (Los Angeles Science Fantasy Society) and NESFA (New England Science Fiction Association) are the other two. The former theater at 3310 East Baltimore Street, in the Highlandtown section of Baltimore, is being slowly renovated as time and money allow. On December 15, 2004, after a long fight by BSFS the Maryland Court of Appeals ruled favorably on the tax exemption status of the BSFS building, reversing a ruling by the Maryland State Department of Assessment and Taxation. The decision forced the state to revise the Maryland property tax code for literary organizations and other non-profit organizations that serve an educational purpose.

Along with the plethora of regular events it hosts, BSFS also maintains a popular SF resources website with something for everyone who likes science fiction in any of its cultural art forms.

References

External links
Baltimore Science Fiction Society Official Website

Highlandtown, Baltimore
Science fiction fandom
Fantasy fandom
Culture of Baltimore
Science fiction organizations
Organizations based in Baltimore
1963 establishments in Maryland